This page details records and statistics related to Derby County F.C..

Player records

Appearances

Players with 300 or more appearances for the club:

Current players with 100 or more appearances:

As of 19 March 2023
 All Competitions stats include League, FA Cup, League Cup, League Test Match, Playoffs, Charity Shield, European Cup, UEFA Cup, Texaco Cup, Football League Trophy, Full Members Cup and Anglo-Italian Cup

Other records

 Youngest first-team player – Mason Bennett, 15 years 99 days, v. Middlesbrough, Championship, 22 October 2011.
 Oldest first-team player – Peter Shilton, 42 years 164 days, v. Watford, Division Two, 29 February 1992

Goalscorers

Players with 50 or more goals for the club:

Current players with 10 or more goals for the club:

 As of 19 March 2023
 All Competitions stats include League, FA Cup, League Cup, League Test Match, Playoffs, Charity Shield, European Cup, UEFA Cup, Texaco Cup, Football League Trophy, Full Members Cup and Anglo-Italian Cup

Other records

 Most goals in a season – 43, Jack Bowers – 35 First Division, 8 FA Cup (1932–33)
 Most league goals in a season – 37, Jack Bowers, First Division, (1930–31) and 37, Ray Straw, Division 3 (N), (1956–57)
 Most goals in a single match – 6, Steve Bloomer (v. Sheffield Wednesday, First Division, 21 January 1899)
 Most goals in an FA Cup match – 4, joint record: Harry Bedford (v. Bradford City, 8 January 1927) and Jackie Stamps (v. Luton Town, 5 January 1946)
 Most goals in a League Cup match – 4, joint record Alan Hinton (v. Stockport County, 4 September 1968) and Kevin Wilson (v. Hartlepool United, 29 August 1984)
 Most goals in a European match – 5, Kevin Hector (v. Finn Harps, UEFA Cup, 15 September 1976)
 Youngest goalscorer – Mason Bennett, 16 years 176 days (v. Tranmere Rovers, FA Cup, 5 January 2013)
 Scoring in successive league matches – 6, joint record, John Goodall (1891–92), Alf Bentley (1909–10), Horace Barnes (1913–14), George Stephenson (1927–28), Jack Bowers (1930–31 and 1933–34) – the only Derby player to achieve this twice, Ray Straw (1956–57), Eddie Thomas (1964–65) – his first six games for Derby, Francesco Baiano (1997–98)

International caps

 First Derby international – Benjamin Spilsbury (for England v Ireland, 1885)
 Most capped Derby player while playing for the club – Deon Burton, 42 caps for Jamaica
 Most capped Derby player for England while playing for the club – Peter Shilton, 34 caps
First Derby County players to play in a World Cup – Bruce Rioch and Don Masson (for Scotland v. Peru, 3 June 1978)
First Derby players to play in a World Cup for England – Peter Shilton and Mark Wright (v. Republic of Ireland, 11 June 1990)

Club records

Wins
Most League wins in a season – 28 in 46 matches, Division 3 (N), (1955–56)
Fewest League wins in a season – 1 in 38 matches, Premier League, 2007–08

Defeats

Most League defeats in a season – 29 in 38 matches, Premier League, 2007–08
Fewest League defeats in a season – 5 in 42 matches, Second Division 1968–69

Goals

 Most League goals scored in a season – 111 in 46 matches, Division 3 (N), (1956–57)
 Fewest League goals scored in a season – 20 in 38 matches, Premier League, 2007–08
 Most League goals conceded in a season – 90 in 42 matches, First Division, (1936–37)
 Fewest League goals conceded in a season – 28 in 38 matches, Second Division, 1911–12

Points

 Most points in a League season (2 for a win) – 63 (from a possible 84) in 42 matches, Second Division, 1968–69 and Division 3 (N), (1955–56) and (1956–57)
 Most points in a League season (3 for a win) – 85 (from a possible 138) in 46 matches, Championship, 2013–14
 Fewest points in a League season (2 for a win) – 23 (from a possible 84) in 42 matches, Second Division, (1954–55); 15 (from a possible 44) in 22 matches, Football League, (1890–91)
 Fewest points in a League season (3 for a win) – 11 (from a possible 114) in 38 matches, Premier League, 2007–08

Matches

Firsts
First match – v. Great Lever, Friendly, 13 September 1884 (lost 6–0)
First FA Cup match – v. Walsall Town, First Round, 8 November 1884 (lost 7–0)
First League match – v. Bolton Wanderers, Football League, 8 September 1888 (won 6–3)
First League Cup match  – v. Watford, 11 October 1960 (won 5–2)
First European match – v. FK Željezničar, European Cup, 13 September 1972 (won 2–0)

Record wins
Record league victory: 9–0, (twice; home v. Wolves, Football League, 10 January 1891 & v. Sheffield Wednesday, First Division, 21 January 1899)
Record away league victory: 8–0, (v. Bristol City Second Division, 29 September 1923)
 Record FA Cup win – 8–1 (home v. Barnsley St. Peter's, 30 January 1897)
 Record League Cup win – 7–0 (home v. Southend United, 7 October 1992)
 Record Premier League win – 4–0 (twice; home v. Southampton, 27 September 1997 and home v. Bolton Wanderers, 13 April 1998)
 Record European win – 12–0 (home v. Finn Harps, UEFA Cup, 15 September 1976)
 Record win on aggregate – 16–1 (v. Finn Harps, UEFA Cup 1976–77)

Record defeats
 Record League defeat – 0–8 (twice; away v. Blackburn, Football League, 3 January 1891 and v. Sunderland, First Division, 1 September 1894)
 Record home defeat – 0–7 (v. Walsall, FA Cup, 8 January 1884)
 Record FA Cup defeat – 2–11 (away v. Everton, 18 January 1890)
 Record Premier League defeat –  0–6 (twice; away v. Liverpool, 1 September 2007 and home v. Aston Villa 12 April 2008)
 Record League Cup defeat – 0–5 (twice; away v. Southampton, 8 October 1974 and away v. West Ham United, 1 November 1988)
 Record European defeat – 1–5 (away v. Real Madrid, European Cup, 5 November 1975)

Record draws
 Highest scoring draw – 5–5 (Home v. Everton, First Division, 15 October 1898, away v. Birmingham City, Second Division, 9 April 1966 and Home v. Scunthorpe, League Cup, 2012)

Attendances

The Racecourse Ground
 Highest attendance: 15,500 (est.) (v. Blackburn Rovers, FA Cup, 24 February 1894)
 Lowest attendance: 750 (est.) (v. Darwen, First Division, 18 November 1893)

The Baseball Ground
 Record attendance: 41,826 (v. Tottenham Hotspur, Football League First Division, 20 September 1969)
 Lowest attendance: 1,562 (v. Udinese, Anglo-Italian Cup, 15 November 1994)

Pride Park Stadium
 Highest attendance: 33,378 (v. Liverpool, Premier League, 18 March 2000)
 Lowest attendance:  4,747(v. Salford City, League Cup, 10 August 2021)

Transfers
 Record transfer fee paid: £10,000,000 to Arsenal F.C. for Krystian Bielik (2019)
 Record transfer fee received: £11,300,000 from Huddersfield Town for Tom Ince (2017);

References

External links
 Match reports and line-ups from 1930 to present TheRams.co.uk

Records and Statistics
Derby County